The Abierto Zapopan, also known as Abierto Akron Zapopan for sponsorship reasons, was a WTA 250-level professional women's tennis tournament. It used to take place on outdoor hardcourts, around the month of March at the Panamerican Tennis Center in the city of Zapopan, Mexico (Guadalajara metro area). The tournament became a WTA 250 in 2021. Its inaugural edition in 2019 was held as a WTA 125 event. The 2020 edition was cancelled due to the COVID-19 pandemic.

Results

Singles

Doubles

References

External links
 Official website

 
Tennis tournaments in Mexico
Hard court tennis tournaments
WTA 125 tournaments
WTA Tour
Annual events in Mexico
2019 establishments in Mexico
Recurring sporting events established in 2019